Vagla is a Gurunsi (Gur) language of Ghana with about 14,000 speakers. It is spoken in a number of communities around the western area of Northern Region, Ghana. Such communities includes: Bole, Sawla, Tuna, Soma, Gentilpe, and Nakwabi. The people who speak this language are known as Vaglas, one of the indigenous tribes around that part of the Northern Region, which were brought under the Gonja local administration system "Gonjaland" by British Colonial Rulers under their Centralised System of Governance.

References

Languages of Ghana
Gurunsi languages